The island of Anguilla is home to 16 Important Bird Areas, as designated by BirdLife International.

IBAs
Cauls Pond
Cove Pond
Dog Island
Forest Bay Pond
Grey Pond
Katouche Canyon
Long Salt Pond
Meads Bay Pond
Merrywing Pond System
Mimi Bay
Prickly Pear (East and West)
Rendezvous Bay Pond
Road Salt Pond
Scrub Island
Sombrero
West End Pond

References

Important Bird Areas of Anguilla